Wooroonden is a rural locality in the South Burnett Region, Queensland, Australia. In the  Wooroonden had a population of 59 people.

History 
Wooroon State School opened in 1917. In 1919 the spelling was changed to Woroon State School. In 1925 it was renamed Woroonden State School. It closed in 1963.

The district was originally known as Woroonden but on advice from the Murgon Shire Council on 24 January 2002, the locality name spelling was officially made Wooroonden.

In the  Wooroonden had a population of 59 people.

References 

South Burnett Region
Localities in Queensland